The Soronian Society is a sorority at Olivet College, in Olivet, Michigan.

The Soronian Society was founded in 1847 as a women's literary Society at Olivet College, in Olivet, Michigan. About twenty years later, in 1868, the group adopted the Greek letters of Iota Kappa Omicron. Both names are used today. The society's original name, Soronian, was created from the letters in the names of the original eight founding members, however, the names of these women were lost to a fire and have yet to be recovered.

Symbolism and traditions 
Soronian's motto is "Strong in Love, Firm in Right". Its colors are red & white and official flower is the red rose. The group uses an Old English Font "S" as a symbol for their society.

Iota Kappa Omicron (IKO) - Soronian - maintains a "sister house" relationship with neighboring fraternity Phi Alpha Pi, also on Olivet's Campus.

Housing 
The society currently resides in a home known as Sperry Hall. Sperry Hall was built in 1905, completed in 1907 therefore making the house 110 years old to date. The house has 9 rooms and can hold up to 19 active members.

References 

Olivet College
Student organizations established in 1847
1847 establishments in Michigan
Student societies in the United States